Kasal may refer to:

People
Bünyamin Kasal (born 1997), Turkish footballer 
Bradley Kasal (born 1966), United States Marine 
Michal Kasal (born 1994), Czech handball player 
Yusuf Kasal (born 1988), German-Turkish footballer

Arts and entertainment 
Kasal (2014 film), Filipino film directed by Joselito Altarejos
Kasal (2018 film), Filipino film directed by Ruel S. Bayani
Kasal, Kasali, Kasalo (or Wedding, Together, Partaker), 2006 Filipino romantic comedy film directed by Jose Javier Reyes